Antoine Merle (22 March 1921 – 30 April 2013) was a French wrestler. He competed at the 1948 Summer Olympics and the 1952 Summer Olympics.

References

External links
 

1921 births
2013 deaths
French male sport wrestlers
Olympic wrestlers of France
Wrestlers at the 1948 Summer Olympics
Wrestlers at the 1952 Summer Olympics
Place of birth missing
20th-century French people